Mixersville is an unincorporated community in Bath Township, Franklin County, Indiana.

History
Mixersville was platted in 1846 by William Mixer, and named for him. A post office was established at Mixersville in 1851, and remained in operation until it was discontinued in 1903.

Geography

References

Unincorporated communities in Franklin County, Indiana
Unincorporated communities in Indiana